The following is a list of pipeline accidents in the United States in 1982. It is one of several lists of U.S. pipeline accidents. See also: list of natural gas and oil production accidents in the United States.

Incidents 

This is not a complete list of all pipeline accidents. For natural gas alone, the Pipeline and Hazardous Materials Safety Administration (PHMSA), a United States Department of Transportation agency, has collected data on more than 3,200 accidents deemed serious or significant since 1987.

A "significant incident" results in any of the following consequences:
 Fatality or injury requiring in-patient hospitalization.
 $50,000 or more in total costs, measured in 1984 dollars.
 Liquid releases of five or more barrels (42 US gal/barrel).
 Releases resulting in an unintentional fire or explosion.

PHMSA and the National Transportation Safety Board (NTSB) post-incident data and results of investigations into accidents involving pipelines that carry a variety of products, including natural gas, oil, diesel fuel, gasoline, kerosene, jet fuel, carbon dioxide, and other substances. Occasionally pipelines are re-purposed to carry different products.

The following incidents occurred during 1982:

 1982 On January 1, a gas pipeline exploded and burned in Ottawa, Kansas, destroying 2 mobile homes. There were no injuries.
 1982 On January 28 at Centralia, Missouri, natural gas at 47 psig entered a low pressure distribution system which normally operated at 0.40 psig after a backhoe bucket snagged, ruptured, and separated a 3/4-inch steel pressure regulator control line at a regulator station. The backhoe, owned and operated by the city of Centralia, was being used to clean a ditch located adjacent to the pressure regulator station. The high-pressure gas entering customer piping systems in some cases resulted in high pilot light flames which ignited fires in buildings; while in other cases, the pilot light flames were blown out, allowing gas to escape within the buildings. Of the 167 buildings affected by the overpressure, 12 were destroyed and 32 had moderate to heavy damages. Five persons received minor injuries.
 1982 On March 19, a leaking 3 inch Amoco pipeline was discovered in a park in Salt Lake City, Utah. 1,500 square feet of sod near a soccer field was contaminated by oil, and had to be disposed of as toxic waste.
 1982 A Mobil LPG pipeline was ruptured by road construction in North Richland Hills, Texas on April 16. 800 to 1,000 nearby residents were evacuated. There was no fire.
 1982 A backhoe ruptured a 2-inch gas pipeline in three places in Tacoma, Washington, causing evacuations. There was no fire or explosion.
 1982 On May 14, a bulldozer hit a gas pipeline while digging a reserve pit for an oil well near Rush Springs, Oklahoma, causing a gas fire that injured 9 workers.
 1982 On May 18, Sunoco pipeline crews were digging to find their 12-inch pipeline, when they hit it, causing a rupture, and  spilling gasoline east of Gettysburg, Pennsylvania. Over 20,000 gallons of gasoline were spilled.
 1982 A bulldozer hit a Colonial Pipeline 12-inch petroleum products pipeline near Albany, Georgia on June 15, spraying the area with fuel oil, which then ignited, resulting in burns that later killed the bulldozer operator. No one had called for a locate of the pipeline before the bulldozer work.
 1982 On June 28, a natural gas explosion demolished a house, killed five persons, and critically injured one person in Portales, New Mexico; the critically injured person died later at a burn treatment center. The gas service line to the house had been damaged 37 days earlier when a contractor's backhoe pulled up the line during conduit excavation work for the local telephone company.
 1982 On July 27, an explosion & fire occurred at a Koch Industries propane pipeline pumping station, near Harper, Kansas. Power was knocked out in the area for a time. 
 1982 A Tennessee Gas Pipeline was struck by a crew working on that pipeline in Prichard, West Virginia on July 28. Nine people were burned, including a family of 4 who were standing nearby. In addition, 200 feet of a nearby road was burned.
 1982 On August 15, a Colonial Pipeline stub line failed in Floyd County, Georgia, spilling over 16,000 gallons of gasoline in the area of a subdivision. 15 families were evacuated for a time. There were no injuries.
 1982 On September 7, natural gas at 15 psig escaping from the open ends of a 2 1/4-inch cast-iron gas main located in a deep, narrow excavation in Dublin, Georgia, was ignited by an unknown source. Four City of Dublin gas department employees who were working in the excavation were critically burned.
 1982 A bulldozer being used for highway construction hit a Diamond Shamrock pipeline on September 10, in Roanoke, Texas, spilling unleaded gasoline. 5 miles of a nearby highway were shut down for a time. 
 1982 On September 13, a county worker hit an NGL pipeline near Leavenworth, Kansas, causing minor injuries to him when the escaping gas blew him off of the bulldozer. Several families living nearby were evacuated. There was no fire.
 1982 On October 1, a steel plate, which had been welded by a work crew to cap temporarily the open end of a section of a 22-inch gas transmission pipeline, blew off at an initial pressure of possibly 260 psig. Escaping natural gas from the pipeline, which had accumulated due to a leak in a nearby gate valve, ignited almost immediately and the entire work area and a portion of U.S. Route 65 were momentarily engulfed in flames.
 1982 On October 29, a crew mechanic working on new gas service lines in Burke, Virginia, was overcome by leaking gas and died.
Natural gas escaping at about 820 psig ignited immediately, and the ensuing fire killed five persons.
 1982 On December 8, a five-member crew was working on a gas compressor at Bonicord, Tennessee, when a gas explosion occurred. All five crew members were injured seriously, but were able to evacuate the building. One crew member died later that day, and two others died a few days later.
 1982 A grader working on construction cut into a crude oil pipeline in Norman, Oklahoma on December 21, causing a fire that severely burned the grader operator.

References

Lists of pipeline accidents in the United States